Frauenfeld District is one of the five districts of the canton of Thurgau, Switzerland. Its capital, and the capital of Thurgau, is the city of Frauenfeld.
The district shares borders with canton Zurich and canton Schaffhausen as well a river border with the German enclave of Büsingen am Hochrhein.

The district contains the following municipalities:

References

Districts of Thurgau